The Impossible Dream was the third album by The Sensational Alex Harvey Band. It was released in 1974. The album was released separately on CD but can be hard to find; however, the CD is widely available on a 2-in-1 album, the other album being Tomorrow Belongs to Me. It was the band's first release to chart, peaking at No. 16 on the UK Album Chart. "Anthem" was the last single released by SAHB in the U.S.

Between March 26-04 April 1974 at Advision Studios, London, the SAHB had recorded an album with producer Shel Talmy. It remained unreleased until 2009 when it was released as Hot City. Many of the songs were re-recorded for The Impossible Dream.

Track listing
All tracks composed by Alex Harvey and Hugh McKenna; except where indicated.

Personnel

The Sensational Alex Harvey Band
 Alex Harvey – lead vocals, rhythm guitar
 Zal Cleminson – guitar
 Chris Glen – bass guitar
 Hugh McKenna – keyboards, synthesizer
 Ted McKenna – drums

Additional musicians
 Vicky Silva – guest vocals on "Anthem"
 London-Scottish TA Regiment (including John Gilligan) – drums and pipes on "Anthem"

Technical
 The Sensational Alex Harvey Band – producer
 David Batchelor – producer (all tracks except #4)
 Derek Wadsworth – producer (track 4)
 Martin Rushent – engineer (all tracks except #4)
 Dave "Cyrano" Langston – engineer (track 4)
 Keith Davis – cover illustration, design

Charts

Certifications

References

The Sensational Alex Harvey Band albums
1974 albums
Vertigo Records albums
Albums recorded at Apple Studios